Senator Sawyer may refer to:

Members of the United States Senate
Frederick A. Sawyer (1822–1891), U.S. Senator from South Carolina
Philetus Sawyer (1816–1900), U.S. Senator from Wisconsin from 1881 to 1893

United States state senate members
Enos K. Sawyer (1879–1933), New Hampshire State Senate
Harry William Sawyer (1880–1962), Nevada State Senate
Samuel Tredwell Sawyer (1800–1865), North Carolina State Senate
Thomas C. Sawyer (born 1945), Ohio State Senate
Timothy T. Sawyer (1817–1905), Massachusetts State Senate
Tom Sawyer (Maine politician) (born 1949), Maine State Senate
Vickie Sawyer (born 1970s), North Carolina State Senate